Mont de Gourze is a mountain in Switzerland, overlooking Lake Geneva in the canton of Vaud.

On the summit is located the medieval lookout tower of Gourze.

References

External links
Mont de Gourze on Hikr

Mountains of the canton of Vaud
Mountains of Switzerland
Mountains of Switzerland under 1000 metres